Moses Herman Cone (June 29, 1857 – December 8, 1908) was an American businessman, textile entrepreneur, conservationist, and philanthropist of the Gilded Age who was active in the eastern and southern United States.  He began his career in sales and became an innovator who offered finished clothing, which was unusual in an era when textiles were normally sold as unfinished cloth. Cone manufactured unusual textile fabrics and founded a company that became a leading manufacturer of denim. His company was a major supplier to Levi Strauss and Company for nearly a century.

Cone and his wife had no children and donated substantial property upon their deaths.  Their home, Flat Top Manor, has become a North Carolina tourist attraction that receives 250,000 visitors a year.  It forms part of Flat Top Estate and Memorial Park, which is run by the National Park Service.  Their donations founded the Moses Cone Health System, a private not-for-profit health care system based in Greensboro, North Carolina, and its principal facility Moses Cone Hospital.

Genealogy 

Moses' paternal grandfather, Moses Kahn (1781-1853), was a hay merchant who came from Altenstadt, Swabia, Germany. Kahn married Klara Marx and they had ten children, two sons and eight daughters. Their last child in the family was Herman Kahn (1828-1897), who was Moses' father. When Herman was 17 years old, he could no longer see a favorable future in Germany so in 1845 he became interested in a new life in America. He saw two problems staying in his homeland. One was that he was the second-born son and therefore could not take over his father's business, as that responsibility fell to his senior brother Samson. The second problem he saw was that of the local conscription laws. They predicated that upon turning 18 all males were to go into military service. The service was not tolerant of Jews and did not made allowances for their customs or religious practices. The fact that Herman left for America before his 1846 birthday, when he was still 17, suggests that he wanted to avoid military service when he turned 18.

Herman was among several of Kahn's children to go to America for better opportunities. By 1846, Herman's older sister Elise had already been in Richmond, Virginia, for several years. In 1841 she was married to Abraham Hirsh who was also an immigrant from Altenstadt. Family records show they had three children by 1845. When Herman first arrived in the United States he stayed with the Hirshs for a while until he could establish himself. While living in Richmond, Herman changed his last name from Kahn to "Cone" to anglicize it.

Early life 
Moses' father Herman had a dry goods and grocery business in Jonesborough, Tennessee, along with his brother-in-law Jacob Adler, the husband of his sister Sophia. While running the business Herman and Jacob would alternately make week-long peddling trips selling their wares. On one of these trips Herman met Helen Guggenheimer near Lynchburg, Virginia. They married in 1856 and Moses was born in Jonesborough on June 29, 1857.

Two years later came their next child named Ceasar with whom Moses enjoyed a close relationship all his life. Between 1860 and 1870 Moses' father became fairly well-to-do through his business affairs and real estate ventures. The family grew by five additional children while they lived in Jonesborough.  They then moved to Baltimore, Maryland, and there Moses' father and relatives started a wholesale grocery enterprise called Guggenheimer, Cone, & Company, Wholesale Grocers at #22 Commerce Street. Then in 1873 Jacob Adler also moved to Baltimore and went in partnership with Herman selling groceries. They formed a new firm that was called Cone & Adler. They ran the business successfully and in 1878 dissolved it when both their sets of children had matured.

Adult life 
Moses and Ceasar, now as young adults in the Gilded Age, formed a new firm with their father: H. Cone & Sons. The brothers were traveling salesmen, sometimes known as "drummers", for their father's dry goods firm. They sold their wholesale groceries and cigars from Maryland to Alabama. In Alabama they traded with Tuscaloosa Manufacturing Company and in Georgia they did business with the Muscogee Manufacturing Company. They often traded these grocery items for textiles produced in the dozens of mills on their route, because the mills had commissaries to stock for their employees. The textiles consisted of sheetings, plaids, denims, shirtings, yarns and sewing threads. These were sold later to other customers they had that they were trading with along their route. The mills had been built across the Piedmont area of the United States during the Reconstruction period (1865–1877) and the Cone brothers learned the basics of the industry related to textiles and clothing. They bought stock in some of the mills as an investment.

In the 1880s the Cones then moved to Eutaw Place in Baltimore, on the same street as the Lindau family. In 1884, Moses began to court Bertha Lindau, the eldest daughter. Moses and Bertha in all likelihood met at a community social club called the Sociables. Moses' and Bertha's courtship would last four years, during which time Bertha was also wooed by others, including Moses' own brother Ceasar.  Moses and Bertha were both from German Jewish descendants and had much in common. In addition, they both were firstborn children from large families. They married on February 15, 1888, and would have no children themselves.

Career

Early years with textiles
Moses and Ceasar dealt much with textile mill owners in their travels as salesmen. They not only sold normal dry goods, but introduced into their wares ready-made clothing as well as certain fabrics like denim. This gave them considerable experience then in textile products and the textile industry. The Cone brothers soon invested in Southern textile mills which generally had over a 20% return on average. One of these companies the Cones invested into was C. E. Graham Manufacturing of Asheville, North Carolina, an up-and-coming newly formed textile mill. Moses became its president in 1882. The company's original builder Charles Edward Graham continued with its on-site management while Moses pursued other investments and ventures.

In 1880 Moses moved to Greensboro, North Carolina. Soon thereafter he joined Simon Lowman and Charles Burger to form Cone Brothers, Lowman, and Burger Clothing Manufacturers based in Baltimore. Moses discovered the need for durable clothing for the blue-collar people of the High Country and fulfilled this need with denim and plain, fabric-based clothing.

Cone Export & Commission Company

In 1890 Moses and Ceasar were contemplating even grander ventures and formed the Cone Export & Commission Company in New York City along with Anderson Price and Jay C. Guggenheimer as the other major stockholders. They developed by the early 1890s what was called by the Northern politicians the "Plaid Trust", which was a commission clearing house to control the production market on checks and plaids. They were a marketer of Southern cloth mill-goods to South America in competition with Great Britain. Initially the par value of the capital stock of their new company was fifty dollars per share. There were 20,000 shares of the company, so the value of this new firm was placed at one million dollars. By 1892 they moved from New York City to Greensboro, North Carolina. Eventually they took in another forty mills over time and completely controlled the market. Later the United States antitrust laws broke up the agreements the Cones had with the various mills to control the market.

In 1895 Moses purchased a defunct steel mill and developed it into a large cotton mill called Proximity Manufacturing Company that produced blue and brown denim. The reason it was called Proximity was because of its location near the cotton fields of the Old South that produced the raw material needed to produce fabric. Their competitors in the New England states were located much farther away from the cotton fields. He built additional mills throughout the Greensboro area and the Deep South and soon became one of the biggest producers of the denim fabric in the world, becoming known as "The Denim King" in the 1890s.

Moses with his brother Ceasar built another mill in 1905 about a mile away from  Proximity Mill to help them supply the world's demand for denim. They named the new enterprise White Oak Cotton Mills for the 200 year old oak tree that stood near the mill. It became the largest denim mill in the world and largest cotton mill in the southern United States. Cone Mills Corporation was the world leader in the manufacturing of denim and largest supplier in the world. In the early 1900s Cone began supplying denim to Levi Strauss and Company, a relationship that lasted for about 100 years. Moses was instrumental in the development of Watauga Academy, now known as Appalachian State University. In 1899, Moses donated $500 to the founders; it was the largest single donation received for the school's construction.

Death
Moses died at age 51 in 1908 of pulmonary edema at Johns Hopkins Hospital.

Approximately a mile by trail from the manor are the Cone graves in a fenced off area that has a massive monument with plaques marked:

Widow and sisters
His childless wife Bertha lived an additional 39 years and donated the Flat Top Mansion property to the Moses Cone Hospital. Years later the hospital conveyed the property to the National Park System with the proviso that it be known as the Moses Cone Memorial Park.

The Cone sisters, Claribel and Etta, were two of Moses' younger sisters. They befriended Picasso and Matisse while living amongst the School of Paris in its prime in Europe. The Cone Collection is one of the greatest in the world for these artists.

References

Sources

External links 
The Blue Ridge Parkway Guide by Virtual Blue Ridge

1857 births
1908 deaths
American textile industry businesspeople
American people of German-Jewish descent
Moses H.
Watauga County, North Carolina
Appalachian culture
History of Greensboro, North Carolina
People from Jonesborough, Tennessee
Businesspeople from Baltimore
Businesspeople from Greensboro, North Carolina
Jeans
Jewish American philanthropists